The Museum of Italian Art (Spanish: Museo de Arte italiano) is a public museum in Lima, Peru, under the administration of the National Culture Institute. It's the only European arts museum in Peru.

History
The Museum of Italian Art was the gift from the Italian community in Peru, for the 100th Anniversary of the Independence, in 1921. Its official inauguration occurred on November 11, 1923.

After many years working, the museum passed to be administrated by the National Culture Institute in 1972. The institution received donations from contemporary Italian artists, and the permanent collection was increased with another 35 art works, in 1989 and 1990. Since 1991, major efforts have been made to recover the museum itself -building and collection- and to revalue it. So far, the steps have been made thanks to the Italian embassy' constant support and the Association of Friends of the Museum of Italian Art.

Museum
The building has remained open since the inauguration. The project was given to the Italian architect Gaetano Moretti, who also designed The Chinese Fount, a gift from the Chinese community for the independence celebration. It's located in the second block of Avenue Paseo de la República in the Historic Centre of Lima. It has a big yard, parking lots and 6 rooms for the exhibition of its permanent collection and for the temporary exhibitions that are held there. In the second room there's a big stained glass inspired in Botticelli's Primavera.

Through the building, as in design and decorative elements, ancient Italian art is represented: elements from Bramante's architecture; reliefs and decorative details inspired in Donatello, Ghiberti, Michelangelo and Botticelli. The façade is completed by the emblems of the principal Italian cities and by two Venetian mosaics with the most famous men in Italy's history.

Permanent collection
The first selection of the art works that'd belong to the museum's permanent collection was in charged of Mario Vannini Parenti. That's how he acquired a collection of more than 200 original art works, including sculptures, paintings, drawings, prints and ceramics. So, in the museum, the art of all Italian regions is represented. Most of the collection is from the beginnings of the 20th Century, although avant garde movement is not present.

Services
The museum has an important library, with several information and books about the Italian artists in the museum and also about its history. there is some audiovisual material about its collection. Another service is the Catalogue, with more than 300 pages, with full information about the 313 art works that belong to the permanent collection, as well as the biographies of the Italian artists which art works are exhibited there.

Guided visits for blind people
Since 1998, the museum offers guided visits for blind people. This unique service is part of the museum's philosophy to bring art and culture for all people. With special gloves they can touch the collection of bronze and marble sculptures, which is a unique experience that only they can feel, because touching the artworks is forbidden to the general public.

Association of Friends of the Museum of Italian Art
The Museum, as well as its collection, requires constant care and restoration, the expenses or which are quite significant. That is why, in order to contribute with it and maintain the museum in its original splendor, the Association of friends of the Museum of Italian Art was created in 1991, under the initiative of the Italian Ambassador in Peru. Its principal purpose is to promote all the activities that help to preserve, renew, revive and stimulate the museum's life.

News

The museum, besides having one of the most important collection in Peru, has also held several important temporary exhibitions, like "Giotto en Padua", in 2004, that included the official replica of the Scrovegni Chapel, that had toured other European and South American countries before. And "Del mito al sueño. Rodin... Dalí", in 2008 and 2009, that included 30 sculptuters that belong to Soumaya Museum, from six European masters: Auguste Rodin, Salvador Dalí, Edgar Degas, Emile-Antoine Bourdelle, Pierre-Auguste Renoir and Giorgio de Chirico.

"A collection" 
The new temporary exhibition at the museum, entitled "A collection" will be open to public during May, 2010. It will exhibit the private collection of the Italian ambassador in Lima, Francesco Rausi. In the exhibition, 40 art works -between sculptures and paintings- will be shown to public, and will include the work of avant-garde Russian art, and the contemporary plastic expressions from artist from Italy, Brazil, Canada, Corea, and the United States. From Peru, some work of Fernando de Szyszlo will be exhibited in the show.

External links
 Museum of Italian Art in Facebook
 National Culture Institute
 Blind people visiting the Museum of Italian Art

Italian art
Museums in Lima
Museums in Peru
Neoclassical architecture in Peru
Art museums and galleries in Peru